Pimeclone (Karion, Spiractin) is a drug described as either a psychostimulant or a respiratory stimulant (conflicting reports) which is sold in Europe. It was first synthesized in 1927.

See also 
 2-Benzylpiperidine
 4-Benzylpiperidine
 Benzylpiperazine
 Propylhexedrine

References 

Ketones
1-Piperidinyl compounds
Stimulants
Substances discovered in the 1920s